The 2012 Marian Knights football team was an American football team that represented Marian University as a member of the Mid-States Football Association during the 2012 NAIA football season. In their sixth season under head coach Ted Karras Jr., the Knights compiled a 12–1 record (4–1 against conference opponents) and won the NAIA national championship, defeating , 30–27, in overtime in the NAIA National Championship Game.

Schedule

References

Marian
Marian Knights football seasons
NAIA Football National Champions
Marian Knights football